Sergio Campana (born 1 August 1934) is an Italian lawyer and former professional footballer who played as a forward. He served as the first President of the Italian Footballers' Association (AIC), from its inception in 1968, until 2011, when he decided to step down.

In 2017, he was inducted into the Italian Football Hall of Fame.

References

External links 

 Sergio Campana at Consiglio Nazionale Forense 

Living people
1934 births
Association football midfielders
Association football forwards
Italian footballers
20th-century Italian lawyers
Serie A players
Serie B players
L.R. Vicenza players
Bologna F.C. 1909 players